DJ Rectangle is an American DJ/turntablist and Grammy Award-nominated Dance/Hip Hop/Club record producer.

In 1993, DJ Rectangle won the US DMC Championship and the International DJ Search, sponsored by The Box Television, to become the official DJ for Def Jam recording artist Warren G. He then toured with Warren G on his Regulate tour, and continued to appear on various television shows including Late Night with Conan O'Brien, The Jon Stewart Show, Late Night with David Letterman, MTV Spring Break, and London’s Top of the Pops, to name a few.

DJ Rectangle has also toured with other established artists, including R. Kelly, Heavy D, Montell Jordan, Monica, Bone Thugs n Harmony and Ice Cube. He has also performed with Snoop Dogg, Nate Dogg, The Lady of Rage, Foxy Brown, Tha Dogg Pound, The Luniz, Ron Isley,  and many more.

He was one of the first DJs to integrate original freestyles from major recording artists into his own mixtapes and has released an extensive set of battle records used by many successive DJs to win DMC World Championships. His mixtapes have reached over 100 countries, including Russia, Italy, New Zealand, Japan, France, China, The United Arab Emirates, Australia, Spain, and Germany.

DJ Rectangle went on to become a Grammy Award nominated producer. He has produced records that have sold over 2 million copies, including releases by Eminem, Snoop Dogg, 50 Cent, Justin Timberlake, Dirt Nasty, Mala Rodríguez, and Xzibit. Additionally, he has produced tracks used on television shows such as E! True Hollywood Story, Saturday Night Live, and Super Bowl XLIII as well major motion pictures including 1996's Set It Off starring Jada Pinkett and Queen Latifah, 1997's Fakin' da Funk starring Pam Grier and Dante Basco, The Big Hit starring Mark Wahlberg,  and 2005's Get Rich or Die Tryin' starring 50 Cent.

He attended San Diego State University, and graduated with a Bachelor of Business Administration.

Discography

Television
 2010 Saturday Night Live
 2010 MTV's My Super Sweet 16
 2010 World Poker Tour
 2009 Super Bowl XLIII
 2001 E! True Hollywood Story

Movies
 2005 Get Rich or Die Tryin'
 1998 The Big Hit
 1997 Fakin' Da Funk
 1996 Set It Off

Mixtapes
 2019 Vinyl Warning, Vinyl Rambo, Vinyl Combat 6, Faders of Fury Vol.2, 
 2018 Vinyl Combat 5, Kill Steelz Vol.3, Wax On Wax Off Vol.2, Legend Chapter 2, Fader Invasion, Wrists of Fury, The Six Million Dollar Hand 2, The Wolf of Wax Street
 2017 A Blazing Ape Vol. 1, Deadly Needles 3, 1200's Never Die Vol.2, Ultimate Power Vol.4, Legend Chapter 1, Kill Zone, Dragon's Flare
 2016 Forbidden Faders, Daredevil Technics, 
 2015 Ultimate Power Vol.2, Ultimate Power Vol.3, Fast & Faderless, Vinyl Combat 4
 2014 Deadly Needles 2, Guardians Of The Turntablist, Ultimate Power, Twelve Hundred Ways to Die
 2013 When Worlds Collide, Vinyl Combat 3
 2008 Wax Assassin 2: Training Day, Bad Table Manners
 2006 Casino Royale Vol. 2: For The Gangsters, Casino Royale Vol. 1 : For The Hustlers, Kill Steelz Vol. 2, Kill Steelz Vol. 1
 2005 Fear And Loathing, Rectangle's Big Adventure, 2005 Pyro Technics
 2004 Who Framed DJ Rectangle?, "Resident Evil" Turn Table Apocalypse, Six Million Dollar Hand, Wax On Wax Off, Tonearm Terrorwrist
 2003 1200's Never Die
 2002 Faders Of Fury, Vinyl Combat 2: Attack Of The Clones, Turntable Torture, Deadly Needles
 2000 Enter The Diamond Needle Dynasty
 1999 Behind Bars, Wax Assassin
 1998 The Lightning Fist (Millennium Collection Vol. 7)
 1997 The Tables Have Turned, Deadly Needles
1995 Vinyl Combat, Ill Rated
 1994 Rollin' Deep, O.G Style, Talkin Shit, Let The Bass Kick, Funky Demolition
 1992 Vanilla Dope EP

Battle records
 2009 Scratch Masters Revenge Volume 2
 2007 Ultimate, Ultimate Battle weapon Vol. 8, Ultimate, Ultimate Battle Weapon Vol. 7
 2006 Ultimate, Ultimate Battle Weapon Vol. 6
 2005 Dope Trax Vol. 2
 2003 Battle Wax Vol. 2
 2002 The Vinyl Avengers Vol. 2
 2001 The Best of DJ Rectangle, Ultimate, Ultimate Battle Weapon, Vol. 5, Ultimate, Ultimate Battle Weapon, Vol. 4 (Battle record)
 2000 Scratch Masters Revenge, Vol. 1, Mixes Beats & More, Vol. 2, Mixes Beats & More, Vol. 1
 1999 Ultimate, Ultimate Battle Weapon, Vol. 3, The Vinyl Avengers, Vol. 1, Ultimate, Ultimate Battle Weapon, Vol. 2
 1998 Ultimate, Ultimate Battle Weapon, Vol. 1, Frosted Breaks Vol. 2
 1997 Deadly Needles, Gorilla Breaks, Frosted Breaks, Battle Wax Vol. 1
 1996 Ultimate Battle Weapon Vol. 5, Ultimate Battle Weapon Vol. 4, Original Battle Weapon
 1995 Ultimate Battle Weapon Vol. 3, Ultimate Battle Weapon Vol. 2, Ultimate, Battle Weapon Vol. 1
 1994 Let the Bass Kick, Funky Demolition
 1991 Dope Trax Vol. 1

Production

2008

Mala Rodríguez - Malamarismo 
 "Malamarismo" (Label: Universal Music Spain)

2007

Dirt Nasty - Dirt Nasty 
 "Animal Lover" (Label: Shoot To Kill)

2005

DJ Rectangle Feat. 50 Cent - Get Rich or Die Tryin'
 "Uncle Deuce's Rap" (Label: Aftermath Entertainment)

2003

DJ Rectangle Feat. Eminem and Dree - 1200's Never Die
 "You Must Be Crazy" (Label: Music 4 Da People)

2001

Funkdoobiest - Real Urban Latin 1
 "4-1 Nite" (Label: RCA)

DJ Rectangle - Hip Hop + Rap
 "Ya Ya Door" (Label: De Wolfe)
 "What What" (Label: De Wolfe)
 "First Love" (Label: De Wolfe)
 "How Many Times" (Label: De Wolfe)
 "Best Watch Out" (Label: De Wolfe)
 "Rock The Spot" (Label: De Wolfe)
 "Fake a Smile" (Label: De Wolfe)

DJ Rectangle Feat. The Whoridas - The Ultimate
 "The Way We Do" (Label: South Paw)

DJ Rectangle Feat. Funkdoobiest - The Ultimate
 "Wild Out" (Label: South Paw)

2000

A Lighter Shade of Brown - Greatest Hits
 "Street Life" (Label: Universal Music Group)

Xzibit Feat. Montage - Larger Than Life
 "Larger Than Life" (Label: TVT)

1999

DJ Rectangle - Pumping Energy 3
 Various (Label: De Wolfe)

DJ Rectangle - Hard Beats
 Various (Label: De Wolfe)

1998

Funkdoobiest - The Big Hit (soundtrack)
 "Act On It" (Label: Universal Music Group)

The Whoridas - Cheap Shots, Low Blows and Sucker Punches
 "Get Lifted" (Label: South Paw)

Son Doobie - Cheap Shots, Low Blows and Sucker Punches
 "Cali Life" (Label: South Paw)

1997

DJ Rectangle - Ghetto Politix
 "Turntable Terror" (Label: Universal Music Group/Thump)

Funkdoobiest Feat. Daz Dillinger - Troubleshooters
 "Papi Chulo" (Label: RCA)

1996

Da 5 Footaz - Set It Off (soundtrack)
 "The Heist" (Label: Def Jam Recordings)

The Dove Shack - Fakin' da Funk (soundtrack)
 "Low Low" (Label: Street Solid)

References

External links
Official website
[ DJ Rectangle on Billboard]
[ DJ Rectangle on Allmusic]
DJ Rectangle on Discogs
DJ Rectangle on Msn Entertainment
DJ Rectangle on Yahoo! Music
Soundtrack for Get Rich or Die Tryin'
Soundtrack for Set It Off
Soundtrack for Fakin' da Funk
Soundtrack for The Big Hit

Hip hop record producers
American hip hop DJs
San Diego State University alumni
Living people
Year of birth missing (living people)